The 2015 Tulane Green Wave baseball team represented Tulane University during the 2015 NCAA Division I baseball season. The Green Wave played their home games at Greer Field at Turchin Stadium as a member of the American Athletic Conference. They were led by head coach David Pierce, in his first season at Tulane.

Previous season
In 2014, the Green Wave finished the season 10th in Conference USA with a record of 23–29, 10–18 in conference play. They failed to qualify for the 2014 Conference USA baseball tournament or the 2014 NCAA Division I baseball tournament.

Personnel

Roster

Coaching staff

Schedule

! style="background:#004731;color:white;"| Regular Season
|- valign="top" 

|- bgcolor="#bbffbb"
| February 13 || at  ||  || Eddy D. Field Stadium • Malibu, CA || W 9–3 || Steel (1–0) || Puckett (0–1) ||  || 435 || 1–0 || –
|- bgcolor="#bbffbb"
| February 14 || at Pepperdine ||  || Eddy D. Field Stadium • Malibu, CA || W 9–5 || Rankin (1–0) || Blanchard (0–1) ||  || 410 || 2–0 || –
|- bgcolor="#ffbbbb"
| February 15 || at Pepperdine ||  || Eddy D. Field Stadium • Malibu, CA || L 1–2 || Gamboa (1–0) || Gibaut (0–1) ||  || 403 || 2–1 || –
|- bgcolor="#bbffbb"
| February 18 || at  ||  || Pat Kenelly Diamond • Hammond, LA || W 5–4 || Gibaut (1–1) || Cashman (0–1) || Rankin (1) || 906 || 3–1 || –
|- bgcolor="#bbffbb"
| February 20 ||  ||  || Greer Field • New Orleans, LA || W 1–0 || Gibbs (1–0) || Buonopane (0–1) ||  || 2,225 || 4–1 || –
|- bgcolor="#bbffbb"
| February 21 || San Francisco ||  || Greer Field • New Orleans, LA || W 3–2 (11) || Gibaut (2–1) || Narahara (0–1) ||  || 2,351 || 5–1 || –
|- bgcolor="#bbffbb"
| February 22 || San Francisco ||  || Greer Field • New Orleans, LA || W 5–3 || Yandel (1–0) || Rincon (0–2) || Steel (1) || 2,617 || 6–1 || –
|- bgcolor="#bbffbb"
| February 24 || at  ||  || Maestri Field • New Orleans, LA || W 9–0 || Duester (1–0) || Martinez (0–1) || Johnson (1) || 609 || 7–1 || –
|- bgcolor="#bbffbb"
| February 25 || New Orleans ||  || Greer Field • New Orleans, LA || W 4–0 || Gibbs (2–0) || Smith (1–1) ||  || 1,681 || 8–1 || –
|- bgcolor="#bbffbb"
| February 27 ||  ||  || Greer Field • New Orleans, LA || W 8–2 || Merrill (1–0) || Albrecht (1–1) ||  || 1,700 || 9–1 || –
|- bgcolor="#ffbbbb"
| February 28 || Creighton ||  || Greer Field • New Orleans, LA || L 2–7 || Warren (1–1) || Massey (0–1) ||  || 2,108 || 9–2 || –
|-

|- bgcolor="#bbffbb"
| March 1 || Creighton ||  || Greer Field • New Orleans, LA || W 3–2 || Gibaut (3–1) || Ising (0–1) ||  || 2,000 || 10–2 || –
|- bgcolor="#bbffbb"
| March 3 || at  ||  || Ray E. Didier Field • Thibodaux, LA || W 5–0 || Duester (2–0) || Ernestine (1–1) || Gibbs (1) || 1,378 || 11–2 || –
|- bgcolor="#ffbbbb"
| March 6 ||  ||  || Greer Field • New Orleans, LA  || L 0–2 || Bailey (3–1) || Merrill (1–1) || Bigelow (3) || 1,905 || 11–3 || –
|- bgcolor="#ffbbbb"
| March 7 || Gonzaga ||  || Greer Field • New Orleans, LA  || L 2–7 || Sopko (2–1) || Massey (0–2) || Mills (2) || 2,403 || 11–4 || –
|- bgcolor="#bbffbb"
| March 8 || Gonzaga ||  || Greer Field • New Orleans, LA  || W 3–0 || Yandel (2–0) || Burland (0–1) || Gibaut (1) || 2,113 || 12–4 || –
|- bgcolor="#ffbbbb"
| March 11 || at  ||  || Pete Taylor Park • Hattiesburg, MS || L 4–8 || Cockrell (2–0) || Duster (2–1) ||  || 2,559 || 12–5 || –
|- bgcolor="#bbffbb"
| March 13 ||  ||  || Greer Field • New Orleans, LA || W 3–2 (10) || Gibaut (4–1) || Lowther (0–1) ||  || 1,504 || 13–5 || –
|- bgcolor="#bbffbb"
| March 14 || Xavier ||  || Greer Field • New Orleans, LA || W 1–0 || Rankin (2–0) || Jacknewitz (1–3) ||  || 1,935 || 14–5 || –
|- bgcolor="#bbffbb"
| March 15 || Xavier ||  || Greer Field • New Orleans, LA || W 10–3 || Massey (1–2) || Astle (0–3) ||  || 1,904 || 15–5 || –
|- bgcolor="#bbffbb"
| March 17 || Southeastern Louisiana ||  || Greer Field • New Orleans, LA || W 15–2 || Duester (3–1) || Cashman (2–3) ||  || 2,311 || 16–5 || –
|- bgcolor="#ffbbbb"
| March 20 || at  ||  || Riverside Sports Complex • Riverside, CA || L 1–2 (13) || Genter (3–0) || Gibaut (4–2) ||  || 355 || 16–6 || –
|- bgcolor="#bbffbb"
| March 21 || at UC Riverside ||  || Riverside Sports Complex • Riverside, CA || W 6–5 || Rankin (3–0) || Lillie (0–1) || Duester (1) || 240 || 17–6 || –
|- bgcolor="#ffbbbb"
| March 22 || at UC Riverside ||  || Riverside Sports Complex • Riverside, CA || L 2–6 || Leach (2–2) || Yandel (2–1) ||  || 273 || 17–7 || –
|- bgcolor="#ffbbbb"
| March 24 || LSU ||  || Greer Field • New Orleans, LA || L 7–13 || Newman (2–0) || Duester (3–2) ||  || 4,994 || 17–8 || –
|- bgcolor="#ffbbbb"
| March 27 || Connecticut ||  || Greer Field • New Orleans, LA || L 0–6 || Cross (6–1) || Merrill (1–2) ||  || 1,887 || 17–9 || 0–1
|- bgcolor="#bbffbb"
| March 28 || Connecticut ||  || Greer Field • New Orleans, LA || W 5–1 || Gibbs (3–0) || Kay (3–3) ||  || 2,015 || 18–9 || 1–1
|- bgcolor="#ffbbbb"
| March 29 || Connecticut ||  || Greer Field • New Orleans, LA || L 3–5 || Ruotolo (2–0) || Gibaut (4–3) ||  || 1,950 || 18–10 || 1–2
|- bgcolor="#bbffbb"
| March 31 || at  ||  || Brooks Field • Wilmington, NC || W 8–4 || Duester (4–2) || Magestro (3–2) || Steel (2) || 1,008 || 19–10 || 1–2
|-

|- bgcolor="#ffbbbb"
| April 2 || at East Carolina ||  || Clark–LeClair Stadium • Greenville, NC || L 0–3 || Love (3–2) || Merrill (1–3) ||  || 2,213 || 19–11 || 1–3
|- bgcolor="#ffbbbb"
| April 3 || at East Carolina ||  || Clark–LeClair Stadium • Greenville, NC || L 4–11 || Boyd (3–7) || Rankin (3–1) ||  || 2,411 || 19–12 || 1–4
|- bgcolor="#bbffbb"
| April 4 || at East Carolina ||  || Clark–LeClair Stadium • Greenville, NC || W 8–6 || Massey (2–2) || Lucroy (2–2) || Duester (2) || 2,261 || 20–12 || 2–4
|- bgcolor="#bbffbb"
| April 7 || Nicholls State ||  || Greer Field • New Orleans, LA || W 7–1 || Gibaut 5–3 || Stapler (2–1) ||  || 1,452 || 21–12 || 2–4
|- bgcolor="#ffbbbb"
| April 10 || at Houston ||  || Cougar Field • Houston, TX || L 3–4 || Weigel (3–0) || Duester (4–3) ||  || 1,583 || 21–13 || 2–5
|- bgcolor="#ffbbbb"
| April 11 || at Houston ||  || Cougar Field • Houston, TX || L 1–6 || Dowdy (4–1) || Gibbs (3–1) ||  || 1,512 || 21–14 || 2–6
|- bgcolor="#bbffbb"
| April 12 || at Houston ||  || Cougar Field • Houston, TX || W 3–1 || Massey (3–2) || Cobb (1–1) ||  || 1,603 || 22–14 || 3–6
|- bgcolor="#bbbbbb"
| April 14 || Southern Miss ||  || Greer Field • New Orleans, LA || Postponed ||  ||  ||  ||  ||  ||
|- bgcolor="#bbffbb"
| April 17 || UCF ||  || Greer Field • New Orleans, LA || W 3–0 || Merrill (2–3) || Finfrock (6–3) || Gibaut (2) || 1,106 || 23–14 || 4–6
|- bgcolor="#ffbbbb"
| April 18 || UCF ||  || Greer Field • New Orleans, LA || L 0–8 || Rodgers (7–0) || Gibbs (3–2) ||  || 1,824 || 23–15 || 4–7
|- bgcolor="#bbffbb"
| April 19 || UCF ||  || Greer Field • New Orleans, LA || W 10–0 || Massey (4–2) || Hepple (3–2) || Gibaut (3) || 1,290 || 24–15 || 5–7
|- bgcolor="#ffbbbb"
| April 21 || at LSU ||  || Alex Box Stadium • Baton Rouge, LA || L 0–6 || Bain (1–1) || Duester (4–4) ||  || 10,614 || 24–16 || 5–7
|- bgcolor="#bbffbb"
| April 24 || at Cincinnati ||  || Marge Schott Stadium • Cincinnati, OH || W 4–0 || Merrill (3–0) || Atkinson (3–5) || Gibaut (4) || 522 || 25–16 || 6–7
|- bgcolor="#bbffbb"
| April 25 || at Cincinnati ||  || Marge Schott Stadium • Cincinnati, OH || W 8–6 || Duester (5–4) || Zellner (2–2) ||  || 296 || 26–16 || 7–7
|- bgcolor="#bbffbb"
| April 26 || at Cincinnati ||  || Marge Schott Stadium • Cincinnati, OH || W 9–5 || Massey (5–2) || Lehnen (1–7) || Gibaut (5) || 631 || 27–16 || 8–7
|- bgcolor="#bbffbb"
| April 28 || Southeastern Louisiana ||  || Greer Field • New Orleans, LA || W 5–4 (10) || Steel (2–0) || Sceroler (2–2) ||  || 1,823 || 28–16 || 8–7
|-

|- bgcolor="#bbffbb"
| May 1 || Houston ||  || Greer Field • New Orleans, LA || W 3–1 || Merrill 4–3 || Lantrip (6–3) || Gibaut (6) || 1,100 || 29–16 || 9–7
|- bgcolor="#ffbbbb"
| May 2 || Houston ||  || Greer Field • New Orleans, LA || L 0–3 || Dowdy (7–1) || Massey (7–3) ||  || 2,050 || 29–17 || 9–8
|- bgcolor="#ffbbbb"
| May 3 || Houston ||  || Greer Field • New Orleans, LA || L 1–7 || Romero (6–3) || Duester (5–5) ||  || 2,100 || 29–18 || 9–9
|- bgcolor="#ffbbbb"
|  May 8 || South Florida ||  || Greer Field • New Orleans, LA || L 0–12 || Herget (8–2) || Merrill (4–4) ||  || 2,678 || 29–19 || 9–10
|- bgcolor="#bbffbb"
| May 9 || South Florida ||  || Greer Field • New Orleans, LA || W 5–3 || Duester (6–5) || Valdes (5–2) || Gibaut (7) || 2,167 || 30–19 || 10–10 
|- bgcolor="#bbffbb"
| May 10 || South Florida ||  || Greer Field • New Orleans, LA || W 4–3 || Gibbs (4–2) || Mulholland 4–7 || Gibaut (8) || 2,221 || 31–19 || 11–10
|- bgcolor="#ffbbbb"
| May 12 || Southern Miss ||  || Greer Field • New Orleans, LA || L 4–8 || Talley (3–5) || Yandel (2–2) ||  || 2,368 || 31–20 || 11–10
|- bgcolor="#ffbbbb"
| May 14 || at Memphis ||  || FedExPark • Memphis, TN || L 3–7 || Gunn (6–1) || Merrill (4–5) ||  || 678 || 31–21 || 11–11
|- bgcolor="#bbffbb"
| May 15 || at Memphis ||  || FedExPark • Memphis, TN || W 5–2 (7) || Massey (6–3) || Toscano (8–2) ||  || 510 || 32–21 || 12–11
|- bgcolor="#bbffbb"
| May 16 || at Memphis ||  || FedExPark • Memphis, TN || W 9–1 || Gibbs (5–2) || Alexander (4–2) ||  || 510 || 33–21 || 13–11
|-

|- 
! style="background:#004731;color:white;"| Post-Season
|-

|- bgcolor="#bbffbb"
| May 20 || vs. (6) Connecticut || (3) || Bright House Field • Clearwater, FL || W 3–1 || Duester (7–5) || Zapata (5–1) || Gibaut (9) ||  || 34–21 || 1–0
|- bgcolor="#ffbbbb"
| May 21 || vs. (2) East Carolina || (3) || Bright House Field • Clearwater, FL || L 1–3 || Kruczynski (8–4) || Merrill (4–6) || Ingle (7) || 1,243 || 34–22 || 1–1
|- bgcolor="#ffbbbb"
| May 22 || vs. (6) Connecticut || (3) || Bright House Field • Clearwater, FL || L 6–7 || Holmes (1–0) || Gibbs (5–3) || Kay (1) || 922 || 34–23 || 1–2
|-

|- bgcolor="#ffbbbb"
| May 29 || vs. (2) UNC Wilmington || (3) || Alex Box Stadium • Baton Rouge, LA || L 1–10 || Foster (7–1)  || Duester (7–6) ||  || 10,657 || 34–24 || 0–1
|- bgcolor="#bbffbb"
| May 30 || vs. (4) Lehigh || (3) || Alex Box Stadium • Baton Rouge, LA || W 15–3 || Merrill (5–6) || Stephens (4–7) || Yandel (1) || 10,527 || 35–24 || 1–1 
|- bgcolor="#ffbbbb"
| May 31 || vs. (2) UNC Wilmington || (3) || Alex Box Stadium • Baton Rouge, LA || L 2–8 || Monroe (4–3) || Massey (6–4) ||  || 10,582 || 35–25 || 1–2
|-

|-
| style="font-size:88%"| All rankings from Collegiate Baseball.
|-
| style="font-size:88%"| Schedule and results taken from tulanegreenwave.com . Box scores are available under "related links" in the right-hand navigation.

Rankings

References

Tulane Green Wave
Tulane Green Wave baseball seasons
Tulane